Crystal Reservoir is a 340-acre artificial reservoir on the Gunnison River in western Colorado.  Located in the upper Black Canyon of the Gunnison, the lake was created in 1976 by the U.S. Bureau of Reclamation as part of a larger plan to impound the upper section of the Gunnison for the generation of hydroelectric power, water storage, and public recreation.  Crystal Reservoir is managed by the National Park Service as an element of the Curecanti National Recreation Area.  Located at the far western end of Curecanti, Crystal Reservoir is the smallest, least developed, and least accessible of the three reservoirs within the park.

Background

Crystal Reservoir is part of the Wayne N. Aspinall Unit of the Colorado River Storage Project, a Bureau of Reclamation project that retains the waters of the Colorado River and its tributaries, such as the Gunnison, for agricultural and municipal use.  Crystal Reservoir was created by the impoundment of the Gunnison River approximately 6 miles west of Morrow Point Dam by Crystal Dam, a 323-ft. concrete double-arch dam built by the Bureau of Reclamation.  The last of three reservoirs impounded for the Aspinall Unit, construction on Crystal Dam began in 1973, 5 years after the completion of Morrow Point Dam and 7 years after the completion of Blue Mesa Dam.  The westernmost of the three reservoirs, Crystal is the last impoundment before the river enters the deep and dangerous Black Canyon of the Gunnison.

Recreation

Crystal Reservoir is part of the Curecanti National Recreation Area, a National Park Service administered area responsible for developing and managing recreation facilities on the three reservoirs of the Aspinall Unit. 

 Recreational opportunities at Crystal include boating (hand-carried craft only), camping, and hiking.  There are two small developed areas near the reservoir, Mesa Creek Trailhead and Crystal Creek Trailhead.  Mesa Creek Trailhead is located immediately west of Point Morrow Dam, and can be accessed from a one-mile road running north of U.S. 50 at Cimarron.  Hand-launched watercraft can be launched into Crystal from Mesa Creek.  A single boat-in campsite is located approximately 4 miles west of Mesa Creek at the mouth of Crystal Creek.  Mesa Creek is also the trailhead for the Mesa Creek Trail, a fairly to moderately strenuous 1.5 mile round trip that crosses the reservoir on a footbridge and travels west along the north shore. Though Mesa Creek is a day-use facility, developed campsites are available at nearby Cimarron.  Crystal Creek Trailhead is located on Colorado Highway 92, 24 miles west of Blue Mesa Dam and offers access to the 5-mile (round trip) Crystal Creek Trail.  Moderately strenuous, Crystal Creek trail does reach the water but ends at an overlook 1800 ft. above the reservoir.

See also

List of largest reservoirs of Colorado
Colorado River Storage Project
Crystal Dam
Curecanti National Recreation Area
Blue Mesa Reservoir
Morrow Point Reservoir

External links
NPS: Curecanti National Recreation Area
Bureau of Reclamation: Crystal Dam

References

Reservoirs in Colorado
Gunnison River
Colorado River Storage Project
Curecanti National Recreation Area
Lakes of Gunnison County, Colorado
Protected areas of Gunnison County, Colorado
1976 establishments in Colorado